Nebraska Highway 50 (N-50) is a north–south highway in the state of Nebraska.   The southern terminus is at the Nebraska-Kansas border near Du Bois.  The northern terminus is in the Millard neighborhood of Omaha at an intersection with U.S. Highway 275 (US 275) and N-92.  It is a two lane highway except for the section from Springfield north to the southern edge of the Millard neighborhood in Omaha, which is a divided highway.

Route description
N-50 begins at the Kansas border south of Du Bois.  The highway extends into Kansas as K-63.  It runs through farmland, passes through Du Bois, and meets N-8.  The two highways overlap, first by going north and then by going west, into Pawnee City.  In Pawnee City, the overlap with N-8 ends and a new one with N-65 begins.  The two highways overlap going north out of Pawnee City and separate near Table Rock, Nebraska.  Two miles north, N-50 briefly overlaps N-4 before going north again.  Near Elk Creek, N-50 meets N-62.  Further north, N-50 passes through Tecumseh and meets U.S. Highway 136.  The highway continues due north from Tecumseh through Syracuse, passing by N-41 and N-128 between Tecumseh and Syracuse.  In Syracuse, N-50 meets N-2.

N-50 continues due north from Syracuse, meeting US 34 near Avoca.  Near Manley, N-50 meets N-1.  It continues north and curves northeast before meeting N-66.  N-50 and N-66 overlap until the southwestern edge of Louisville, where they separate, though signage on N-50 has "To N-66" signs in the Louisville area, due to a gap in that highway in Louisville.  After passing through Louisville, N-50 immediately crosses the Platte River and then immediately meets N-31.  N-50 then goes northeast briefly and turns north to go through Springfield, where the highway becomes divided.  As the highway approaches Omaha, it meets N-370 and then Interstate 80.  It then continues north into the Millard neighborhood of Omaha on 144th Street, then turns northeast onto Millard Avenue.  After passing through Millard, N-50 ends by meeting US 275 and N-92.

Major intersections

References

External links

 Nebraska Roads: NE 41-60

050
Transportation in Pawnee County, Nebraska
Transportation in Johnson County, Nebraska
Transportation in Otoe County, Nebraska
Transportation in Cass County, Nebraska
Transportation in Sarpy County, Nebraska
Transportation in Omaha, Nebraska
Transportation in Douglas County, Nebraska